The Omusinga of Rwenzururu is the royal title given to the monarchs of the Kingdom of Rwenzururu. The title was technically held by Charles Mumbere for over 43 years after the first Omusinga, his father Isaya Mukirania, died in 1966. However, Mumbere was not formally crowned and recognised by the Ugandan government until 2009.

List of omusingas
 1963–1966: Isaya Mukirania (Kibanzanga I)
 2009–present: Charles Mumbere (Irema-Ngoma I)

See also
 Rwenzururu movement

References

Kingdom of Rwenzururu
Rwenzori Mountains
Ugandan monarchies